Glen Carbon is a village in Madison County, Illinois, United States,  northeast of St. Louis. The population was 13,842 at the 2020 census.

History

The land was called Goshen Settlement, after the biblical land of Goshen. It was renamed "Glen Carbon" to reflect its coal mining heritage.

Glen Carbon was incorporated as a village in 1892. It operated many coal mines until the last one shut down in 1934. Another industry was the St. Louis brick company, which burned down in the 1930s; then, right after being rebuilt, it burned down and was never rebuilt again.

Glen Carbon residents served during World War I. The city's Doughboy statue, which honors the sacrifice made by two of its residents, has been selected as part of a national competition for restoration as part of the nation's World War I centennial activities.

Three railroads once served Glen Carbon. The Illinois Central Railroad, now the Ronald J. Foster Sr. Heritage Bike Trail, became one of the first rails to trails projects in the US, in 1992. The other two lines were the Norfolk Southern line and the Chicago and North Western line, which ran parallel with each other the entire way through Glen Carbon, and stopped operating in Glen Carbon in March 2000. The Nickel Plate Bike Trail follows both of those right-of-ways, switching back and forth between the NS and CNW lines the whole way through Glen Carbon.

Heritage Museum
Originally built in 1914, this building began as School Street in what is considered "Old Town" Glen Carbon.

Exhibits include:
Artifacts that stress the importance of the railroads and coal mines
Military memorabilia from Glen Carbon's veterans
Historical photograph collection
Baseball memorabilia
Military memorabilia owned by World War 2 Drama Actor; Colin W. Houston
Native American stone tool collection

Yanda Log Cabin
The Yanda Log Cabin is a satellite addition to the Heritage museum. In February 2017, the Yanda Log Cabin received a historical recognition plaque from the National Society Colonial Dames XVII Century organization. The Yanda Log Cabin was built around 1853 by William and Anna Zrala Yanda. They immigrated from Bohemia, Austria and plied their blacksmithing trade on this offshoot of the Goshen Road. The family handed the home down through the generations before selling it in the 1940s.

In 1989, the home was scheduled to serve as a practice burn for the local fire department. The Historical and Museum Commission found out about this and worked to save the building. The Village of Glen Carbon purchased the cabin with knowledge that it would restored by volunteers and be used as a gathering place for residents.

Geography
Glen Carbon is located southwest of the center of Madison County at  (38.759801, -89.969204). It is bordered to the north by Edwardsville, the county seat, to the southeast by Troy, to the south by Maryville, and to the west by Pontoon Beach. Interstate 270 passes through the village north of its center, with access from exits 9 and 12. I-270 leads west  to Florissant, Missouri, and east  to Interstate 70, which continues east  to Vandalia. Illinois Route 157 passes through the west side of the village, leading northeast  to the center of Edwardsville and south  to the west side of Collinsville, while Illinois Route 159 passes through the east side of the village, leading north to the center of Edwardsville and south  to the center of Collinsville. 

Judys Branch passes through the village just south of its center, leading west into the Mississippi River valley lowlands.

Demographics

As of the census of 2000, there were 10,425 people, 4,011 households, and 2,815 families residing in the village. The racial makeup of the village was 89.09% White, 6.96% African American, 0.20% Native American, 2.12% Asian, 0.04% Pacific Islander, 0.41% from other races, and 1.17% from two or more races. Hispanic or Latino of any race were 1.50% of the population.

There were 4,011 households, out of which 34.9% had children under the age of 18 living with them, 59.6% were married couples living together, 8.1% had a female householder with no husband present, and 29.8% were non-families. 22.1% of all households were made up of individuals, and 7.8% had someone living alone who was 65 years of age or older. The average household size was 2.57 and the average family size was 3.06.

In the village, the population was spread out, with 25.3% under the age of 18, 10.2% from 18 to 24, 30.0% from 25 to 44, 23.5% from 45 to 64, and 11.0% who were 65 years of age or older. The median age was 36 years. For every 100 females there were 94.5 males. For every 100 females age 18 and over, there were 91.5 males.

The median income for a household in the village was $55,841, and the median income for a family was $72,182. Males had a median income of $50,086 versus $31,689 for females. The per capita income for the village was $26,374. About 3.2% of families and 5.8% of the population were below the poverty line, including 5.8% of those under age 18 and 6.2% of those age 65 or over.

Parks and recreation
The Village of Glen Carbon operates three parks and the Ronald J. Foster Sr. Heritage Trail, an  trail dedicated to the former mayor in 1991. It follows the old Illinois Central Railroad right-of-way that once served Glen Carbon. In November 2021, Madison County Transit and the Glen Carbon Historical and Museum Commission worked to establish historical markers along the trail that highlight places of importance to Glen Carbon's early history. The signs include information about the sites and photos.

Miner Park
Miner Park is located in the Old Town section. The entrance to the park is located between the American Legion Post and the Glen Carbon Centennial Library. This is the main park in Glen Carbon, with direct access to the Nickel Plate Bike Trail, a  trail that follows the old Chicago & North Western and Norfolk Southern rights-of-way. The CNW & NS Railroads served Glen Carbon until March 2000.

The facilities available are:
Comfort stations
Barbecue grills
Passive areas to view wildlife
Variety of playground equipment
Sheltered pavilions
Band stand for special events
Lighted baseball fields
Large parking lot
Basketball
Concession stand for baseball games
Sandbox
Benches
Old caboose with signal by it
Kiddie Play set
Beautiful entrance with historic signs about Glen Carbon and colorful flowers
Tennis courts
A tetherball

Schon Park
Schon Park is the newest park in Glen Carbon, Illinois. It was opened in 2013, with pavilions, benches, a walking trail and a pond within its limits.  The park sits on 36-acres of land, across from St. Cecelia Church and Village Hall on Glen Carbon Road. The ground breaking for the second phase of the park was on May 25, 2018. The second phase construction will include the building of concrete paths, parking lot, underground utilities, a restroom facility and playground. The final plan for the park includes bicycle and walking trails, a baseball diamond, batting cages, basketball and tennis courts, splash pad, toddler playground and a concession stand.

Facilities:
Playground
Restroom Facility
Bicycle and walking trails
Parking Area 
Access to Ronald J. Foster Sr. Heritage Trail

Village Hall Park
Village Hall Park is a  facility located directly behind the Village Hall at 151 North Main Street. This park is the main sporting and recreational complex in Glen Carbon.

Facilities:
Tennis courts
Lighted baseball field
Concession stand
Comfort stations
Little folks playground
Sheltered pavilions

Citizen Park
Citizen Park was formally located behind Fire Station #1 and off Main Street in Old Town. It serves as the construction site to the new Fire Station #1. Its groundbreaking ceremony took place on September 18, 2018.  The entrance to the Ronald J. Foster Sr. Heritage Trail remains open and available.

Glen Carbon Centennial Library
In 2002 village residents passed a 2.6 million dollar bond issue to build a new library.  After nearly two years of construction, the library opened its 14,000 square foot facility on October 4, 2004, located on Main Street adjacent to the town's historic covered bridge. The library was featured in the Spring 2006 ILA Reporter article highlighting innovative library buildings and was awarded the Bill & Melinda Gates Foundation and Library Journal's Best Small Library in America 2010.

Education
Glen Carbon is served by the Edwardsville Community Unit District 7 School System of elementary, middle and high school education. It is one of the top-rated school districts in Illinois, educating students since 1864.

Glen Carbon is also home to Father McGivney Catholic High School, which was established in 2012. In 2015, the school earned its first state title in Bass Fishing.

Notable people

 Glenn Bradford, Illinois politician and lawyer
 A. J. Epenesa, University of Iowa football defensive lineman<Buffalo Bills NFL>
 Johnny Lucas, outfielder for the Boston Red Sox; born in Glen Carbon

References

External links

 
 Schon Park
 Glen Carbon Library

Villages in Madison County, Illinois
Populated places established in 1892
1892 establishments in Illinois